Jeremy Duchesne (born October 17, 1986) is an American-born Canadian former professional ice hockey goaltender who played one game in the National Hockey League (NHL). His father is the late Gaetan Duchesne. He was born in the Washington, D.C. area suburbs, while his father played for the Washington Capitals, but grew up in Quebec City, Quebec.

Playing career
Duchesne was selected 119th overall in the 2005 NHL Entry Draft by the Philadelphia Flyers. He made his NHL debut on April 1, 2010 with the Flyers against the New York Islanders, allowing one goal in 17 minutes of action after relieving Brian Boucher in the third period.

Career statistics

See also
List of players who played only one game in the NHL

References

External links
 

1986 births
Adirondack Phantoms players
Canadian ice hockey goaltenders
Dayton Bombers players
Halifax Mooseheads players
Ice hockey people from Maryland
Ice hockey people from Quebec City
Kalamazoo Wings (ECHL) players
Living people
Mississippi Sea Wolves players
People from Silver Spring, Maryland
Philadelphia Flyers draft picks
Philadelphia Flyers players
Philadelphia Phantoms players
South Carolina Stingrays players
Val-d'Or Foreurs players
Victoriaville Tigres players